Rest in P is a 1994 posthumous album release by Parliament-Funkadelic guitarist Eddie Hazel. The album was released by P-Vine records in Japan on July 25, 1994, and is composed of previously unreleased tracks recorded by Eddie Hazel between 1975 and 1977. The album features musical support from various members of the P-Funk stable.

Alternate recordings of four tracks from Rest in P with different titles were also featured on the Jams From The Heart EP and were included as bonus tracks on Rhino Records' 2004 limited-edition reissue of Game, Dames and Guitar Thangs.

Despite being heavily sought by collectors, Rest In P has never been released outside of Japan.

Tracks

"Until It Rains" (Grace Cook)
"Beyond Word and Measure" (Grace Cook)
"Relic 'Delic (Purple Hazel)" (Grace Cook)
"Straighten Up" (Grace Cook)
"Juicy Fingers" (Grace Cook)
"We Three" (Grace Cook, George Clinton)
"Why Cry?" (Grace Cook)
"We Are One" (Grace Cook)
"No, It's Not!" (Grace Cook, George Clinton)
"Until It Rains" (Reprise)

Grace Cook is Eddie Hazel's mother. He would occasionally write songs under her name for contractual purposes.

Personnel

Eddie Hazel
Billy Bass Nelson
Tiki Fulwood
Bernie Worrell
Bootsy Collins
Buddy Miles
Jerome Brailey
Lynn Mabry
Dawn Silva

References 

Eddie Hazel albums
1994 albums
Albums published posthumously
P-Vine Records albums